Zacompsia is a genus of picture-winged flies in the family Ulidiidae.

Species 
 Zacompsia colorata Steyskal, 1971
 Zacompsia fulva Coquillett, 1901
 Zacompsia metallica
 Zacompsia planiceps Enderlein, 1927

References

Ulidiinae
Brachycera genera
Taxa named by Daniel William Coquillett